Vera Drake is a 2004 British period drama film written and directed by Mike Leigh and starring Imelda Staunton, Phil Davis, Daniel Mays and Eddie Marsan. It tells the story of a working-class woman in London in 1950 who performs illegal abortions. It won the Golden Lion at the Venice Film Festival and it was nominated for three Academy Awards and won three BAFTAs.

Plot
Vera Drake (Imelda Staunton) is devoted to her family, looking after her husband and children, her elderly mother, and a sick neighbour. Her shy daughter, Ethel (Alex Kelly), works in a lightbulb factory, and her son, Sid (Daniel Mays), tailors men's suits. Her husband, Stanley (Phil Davis), is a car mechanic. Although Vera and her family are poor, their strong family bonds hold them together. During her working day as a house cleaner, Vera performs constant small acts of kindness for the many people she encounters.

She is a kindly person who is eager to help others. Unknown to her family, she also works secretly, providing abortions for young women. She receives no money for providing this service because she believes that her help is an act of charity to women in trouble. However, her partner Lily (Ruth Sheen), who also carries on a black-market trade in scarce postwar foodstuffs, charges two guineas (two pounds and two shillings) for arranging the abortions, without Vera's knowledge.

The film also contains a subplot about an upper-class young woman, Susan (Sally Hawkins), the daughter of one of Vera's employers. Susan is raped by a suitor, becomes pregnant, and asks a friend to put her in contact with a doctor, through whom she can obtain an abortion. The doctor refers her to a psychiatrist, who prompts her to answer questions in a certain way, so that he can legally recommend an abortion on therapeutic psychiatric grounds: that she has a family history of mental illness and that she may commit suicide if not allowed to terminate the pregnancy. The abortion costs her a hundred guineas.

After one of her patients nearly dies, Vera is arrested by the police and taken into custody for questioning. She is held overnight and appears before a magistrate the next morning. Sid is shocked by his mother's secret activities and tells his father that he does not think that he can forgive her. However, in a later conversation with Vera, he expresses fear for what could happen to her in prison, before finally telling Vera that he loves her.

Vera is bailed to appear at the Old Bailey. None of Vera's employers will give her a character reference. Her solicitor thinks she will receive the minimum sentence of 18 months in jail; the judge sentences her to two and a half years imprisonment "as a deterrent to others." This affects all the people who previously depended on Vera's kindness.

While in prison, Vera meets others who have been convicted of performing illegal abortions. They discuss their sentences, explaining that it's not their first time in prison for performing illegal abortions, and that she'll probably only serve half her sentence. Vera tearfully leaves to go to her cell.

Main cast
 Imelda Staunton as Vera Drake
 Phil Davis as Stan Drake
 Daniel Mays as Sid Drake
 Alex Kelly as Ethel Drake
 Sandra Voe as Vera's Mother
 Eddie Marsan as Reg
 Adrian Scarborough as Frank Drake
 Heather Craney as Joyce Drake
 Sally Hawkins as Susan
 Ruth Sheen as Lily
 Lesley Sharp as Jessie Barnes
 Liz White as Pamela Barnes
 Peter Wight as Det. Inspector Webster
 Martin Savage as Det. Sergeant Vickers
 Jim Broadbent as Judge
 Simon Chandler as Mr. Wells
 Lesley Manville as Mrs. Wells
 Marion Bailey as Mrs. Fowler

Background
In Vera Drake, Leigh incorporated elements of his own childhood. He grew up in north Salford, Lancashire, and experienced a very ordinary but socio-economically mixed life as the son of a doctor and a midwife. In the book The Cinema of Mike Leigh: A Sense of the Real, Leigh said, "I lived in this particular kind of working-class district with some relations living in slightly leafier districts up the road. So there was always a tension, or at least a duality: those two worlds were forever colliding. So you constantly get the one world and its relationship with the other going on in my films."

Production
Mike Leigh is known to use unusual methods to achieve realism in his films. "Leigh's actors literally have to find their characters through improvisation and research the ways people in specific communities speak and behave. Leigh and his cast immerse themselves in the local life before creating the story" (1994: 7: Watson 29). Critic Roger Ebert explains:

Leigh often uses improvisation to capture his actors' unscripted emotions. When filming Vera Drake, only Imelda Staunton knew ahead of time that the subject of the film was abortion. None of the cast members playing the family members, including Staunton, knew that Vera was to be arrested until the moment the actors playing the police knocked on the door of the house they were using for rehearsals. Their genuine reactions of shock and confusion provided the raw material for their dialogue and actions.

In addition to these methods utilised by Mike Leigh, the director is also admired for his preference of English actors to Hollywood stars. This has led to criticism of Leigh as being a patroniser of the working class. However, using Dickens in his defence, he rebuts these accusations outright proclaiming that the last thing he seeks in his actors is a stereotype. This stereotype was fiercely criticised in the film, Vera Drake:
These abiding quibbles aside, Vera Drake is a compelling and complex film. Though much has been made of the controversial subject matter – back street abortion – its main theme is the buried family secret, the ticking time bomb that can lurk underneath even the most stable marriage. Much of the film's cumulative power lies in its delineation of a rock solid family suddenly rocked to the core by a revelation that is literally beyond their comprehension: the fact that their beloved, and loving, mother is an abortionist. Why, I ask Leigh, does she keep her secret for so long?Leigh wanted to shoot in 35mm but, after being denied by the producers, the film was shot on 16mm film stock.

Reception

Box office 
As of 9 April 2006, Vera Drake had grossed $12,941,817 at the box office worldwide, including over $3.7 million in the US.

Critical response 
The film has attracted some criticism from those who worked in midwifery during the 1950s. The chief concern is the method of abortion used by Vera Drake in the film. This involves using a Higginson bulb, which is a type of enema syringe, to introduce a warm, dilute solution of carbolic soap and an unspecified liquid disinfectant into the woman's uterus. This method is claimed by Jennifer Worth, a nurse and midwife in the 1950s and 1960s and author of the book Call the Midwife, to be invariably fatal. She called the film itself "dangerous", as it could be shown in countries where abortion is illegal and the method depicted copied by desperate women. In reply Leigh told interviewer Amy Raphael that Worth's criticism overlooked several factors,  such as how the film undoubtedly highlights the risk of infection by exploring such misadventure as a means to ultimately curtail Drake's work and the fact that it was based on many testimonies from women who once had such abortions, thereby proving that the procedure did not almost always result in death.

The website Metacritic, which compiles and averages reviews from leading film critics, gave it a score of 83 out of 100 from 40 reviews. Review aggregator Rotten Tomatoes gives the film an approval rating of 92% based on 160 reviews, with a rating average of 7.9/10. The site's consensus is that, "with a piercingly powerful performance by Imelda Staunton, Vera Drake brings teeming humanity to the controversial subject of abortion."

Home media 
Vera Drake was released on DVD on March 29, 2005.

Awards and nominations
 2004 European Film Awards – won Best Actress and nominated for Best Film
 2004 Venice Film Festival – won Golden Lion for Best Film & Volpi Cup for Best Actress
 2004 Camerimage – won Golden Frog for Best Cinematography
 2004 British Independent Film Awards – won Best British Independent Film, Best Director, Best Actor, Best Actress, Best Supporting Actor/Actress, Best Achievement in Production
 2004 London Film Critics Circle Awards – won British Film of the Year, British Director of the Year, British Screenwriter of the Year, Actress of the Year, British Supporting Actor of the Year
 2005 Golden Globes – nominated for Best Actress – Motion Picture Drama
 2005 BAFTAs – won Best Director, Best Actress in a Leading Role and Best Costume Design. Nominated for Best Film, Best British Film, Best Supporting Actor, Best Supporting Actress, Best Screenplay - Original, Best Editing, Best Production Design, and Best Make Up/Hair
 2005 Academy Awards – nominated for Best Director, Best Actress, Best Original Screenplay

See also
 Abortion in the United Kingdom

References

Bibliography

External links
 
 
 
 
 

2004 films
2004 drama films
British drama films
Films directed by Mike Leigh
Films about abortion
Films set in London
Films set in 1950
Golden Lion winners
Social realism in film
Films whose director won the Best Direction BAFTA Award
BAFTA winners (films)
Films shot in 16 mm film
2000s English-language films
2000s British films